Pearl B. Rardin (March 27, 1886 – August 11, 1968) was an American college football coach and World War I service member. He served as the head football coach at Marshall College in Huntington, West Virginia from 1906 to 1907, compiling a record of 7–2–2.

Rardin was an officer at Fort Benjamin Harrison during World War I.

Head coaching record

References

External links
 

1886 births
1968 deaths
Marshall Thundering Herd football coaches
United States Army personnel of World War I